Charonia lampas is a species of predatory sea snail, a marine gastropod mollusk in the family Charoniidae.

Distribution
This marine species has a wide distribution: the North Sea, the North Atlantic Ocean (Azores, Madeira, the Canaries, Cape Verdes), the Atlantic Ocean (off the African coasts), the Mediterranean Sea, and the Indian Ocean (off Madagascar, the East coast of South Africa).

Description 
The maximum recorded shell length is 390 mm.
The large shell measures up to 400 mm on mainland locations, to 200 mm off island and seamount sites. The protoconch is multispiral, normally eroded except on very juvenile specimens. The teleoconch consists of 8–9 whorls with a moderately high, conical spire and convex whorls, the last one ample and making up slightly more than two-thirds of the total height. The spire whorls are vaguely shouldered, with very flat spiral cords separated by poorly defined, rather narrow interspaces, the shoulder covered by a much broader and flatter cord and commonly, but not always, bearing a spiral series of knobs, paralleled to the abapical side by lesser flat cords with or without spiral rows of knobs. The large aperture is oval in shape, with an elaborate peristome. The  outer lip is flaring, thickened at a short distance from the edge and with internal denticles. The inner part of the peristome shows an appressed parietal callus continued into a foliated columellar callus, which has a raised edge overhanging the siphonal canal on large specimens, and bears indistinct ridges towards the edge. The colour pattern is very characteristic, with articulated spiral bands of light patches on the knobs and dark brown in the interspaces, alternating with medium brown uniform bands. The peristome is white with dark brown denticles on the outer lip and a brownish to reddish hue on the edge of columellar callus.

Habitat 
Minimum recorded depth is 8 m. Maximum recorded depth is 50 m.

Uses
 During the neolithic period Charonia lampas shells were used in necklaces.
 There is evidence of the shell being used as a wind music instrument.

Synonyms

References

 Linnaeus, C. (1758). Systema Naturae per regna tria naturae, secundum classes, ordines, genera, species, cum characteribus, differentiis, synonymis, locis. Editio decima, reformata. Laurentius Salvius: Holmiae. ii, 824 pp.

Charoniidae
Taxa named by Carl Linnaeus
Gastropods described in 1758
Molluscs of the Atlantic Ocean
Molluscs of the Indian Ocean
Molluscs of the Mediterranean Sea
Molluscs of the Azores
Molluscs of the Canary Islands
Gastropods of Cape Verde
Invertebrates of the North Sea
Molluscs of Madagascar
Invertebrates of South Africa